Events in the year 1956 in Turkey.

Parliament
 10th Parliament of Turkey

Incumbents
President – Celal Bayar
Prime Minister – Adnan Menderes
Leader of the opposition – İsmet İnönü

Ruling party and the main opposition
  Ruling party – Democrat Party (DP) 
  Main opposition – Republican People's Party (CHP)

Cabinet
22nd government of Turkey

Events
20 February – The magnitude 5.8 Eskişehir earthquake affected the area with a maximum Mercalli intensity of VIII (Severe), causing moderate damage and four deaths.
23 February – Polemics in the parliament concerning the 6/7 September 1955 event (Istanbul pogrom)
1 March – In İstanbul the previously common seat of the governor and the mayor was split 
8 April – Opening date of Seyhan Dam and hydroelectric plant, the biggest plant (in 1950s)
10 April –  Birecik Bridge over the Fırat River in service
8 July – Three opposition parties issued a common statement
26 October – Turkey joined the  International Atomic Energy Agency IAEA

Births
1  January – Mehdi Eker, government minister
6  February – Nazan Öncel, singer 
9  February – Oktay Vural, politician
1  May – Coşkun Aral, journalist
1  June – İdris Naim Şahin, former government minister
8  July – Meral Akşener, vice speaker of the parliament
24  July – Mehmet Ali Aydınlar, former president of the Turkish Football Federation

Deaths
12 January – Cahit Sıtkı Tarancı (born in 1910), poet
18 January – Makbule Atadan (born in 1885), Atatürk’s sister
21 March – Hatı Çırpan (born in 1890), first female villager MP
15 July – Cemil Cahit Toydemir (born in 1883), a retired general who participated in the Turkish War of Independence
7 December – Reşat Nuri Güntekin (born in 1889), novelist
26 December – Ercüment Ekrem Talu (born in 1886), journalist

Gallery

See also
Turkey at the 1956 Summer Olympics
Turkey at the 1956 Winter Olympics

References

 
Years of the 20th century in Turkey
Turkey
Turkey
Turkey